Zbigniew Suchecki (born 21 July 1984 in Gorzów Wielkopolski, Poland) is a motorcycle speedway rider from Poland.

Career
Suchecki rode for Stal Gorzów Wielkopolski from 2001 to 2002, before joining Zielona Góra for five seasons.

In 2007, he made his British debut for Ipswich Witches, during the same season he was 5th in 2007 Individual Speedway European Championship.

In 2008, he moved from Ipswich to Poole Pirates for the 2008 Elite League speedway season, which proved to be his last season in Britain. However, he continued to ride in Poland for various clubs in all three divisions of Polish speedway (Ekstraliga, Polish Speedway First League and the Polish Speedway Second League).

In 2022, he completed his third season for Start Gniezno.

European championships 
 Individual European Championship
 2007 –  Wiener Neustadt – 6th place (10 points)

Domestic competitions
 Individual Polish Championship
 2006 – 13th place
 2009 – 10th place in Quarter-Final 1
 Silver Helmet U-21:
 2004 – 2nd place

See also
 Poland national speedway team

References

1984 births
Living people
Polish speedway riders
Ipswich Witches riders
Poole Pirates riders
Sportspeople from Gorzów Wielkopolski